Staryi Karavan is a village in Kramatorsk Raion (district) in Donetsk Oblast of eastern Ukraine, at about  north from the centre of Donetsk city, on the left bank of the Siverskyi Donets river, that separates the village from Raihorodok. It belongs to Lyman urban hromada, one of the hromadas of Ukraine.

History
At the beginning of July 2014, during the War in Donbas, the village was liberated from pro-Russian separatists by Ukrainian forces.

At the end of May 2022, during the Russian invasion of Ukraine, after the first Battle of Lyman, the village was captured by the Russian Armed Forces. The settlement was liberated by Ukrainian forces on 5 September, acting as springboard to launch the Second Battle of Lyman.

References

Villages in Kramatorsk Raion